Benjamin Jeffrey Maxwell (born March 30, 1988) is a Canadian professional ice hockey centre who is currently playing with Linköping HC of the Swedish Hockey League (SHL).

Playing career
As a youth, Maxwell played in the 2001 and 2002 Quebec International Pee-Wee Hockey Tournaments with a minor ice hockey team from North Vancouver.

Maxwell was selected 49th overall in the second round of the 2006 NHL Entry Draft by the Montreal Canadiens. While playing with the Kootenay Ice of the Western Hockey League, Maxwell signed a three-year entry level contract with the Canadiens on March 1, 2008.

Maxwell was called up on December 12, 2008, from the American Hockey League (AHL)'s Hamilton Bulldogs to replace the injured Saku Koivu in the lineup. Maxwell made his NHL debut on December 13, 2008, against the Washington Capitals.

On February 24, Maxwell was traded along with a 4th round pick in the 2011 NHL Entry Draft, to the Atlanta Thrashers for Brent Sopel and Nigel Dawes.  He scored his first NHL goal on March 27, 2011 against Craig Anderson of the Ottawa Senators.  He was also named first star of that game.  On July 18, 2011, Maxwell signed a one-year $715,000 contract with the Winnipeg Jets. On November 10, 2011, Maxwell was claimed off waivers by the Anaheim Ducks. When the Ducks placed Maxwell on waivers on December 6, he was re-claimed by the Jets.

On July 6, 2012, Maxwell re-signed to a one-year contract extension with the Jets. In the 2012–13 season, Maxwell was assigned directly to AHL affiliate, the St. John's IceCaps. He remained there for the duration of the year, scoring 11 goals and 40 points in 74 games.  On August 11, 2013, Maxwell with the intention to regain NHL interest, Maxwell signed a one-year contract abroad in the Finnish SM-liiga with Kärpät Oulu where he won the Finnish championship in April, 2014.

On May 29, 2014, Maxwell moved to the Kontinental Hockey League's HC Yugra based in Khanty-Mansiysk on a one-year deal. On February 12, 2015 Maxwell returned to Finland when signed a deal with Oulun Kärpät. He moved back to KHL with HC Sochi for the following two seasons, prior signing a contract with HC Spartak Moscow for 2017–18.

After five seasons in the KHL, Maxwell left Russia to sign a one-year contract as a free agent with Swiss club, SCL Tigers of the NL, on July 12, 2019.

Career statistics

Regular season and playoffs

International

References

External links

1988 births
Anaheim Ducks players
Atlanta Thrashers players
Canadian ice hockey centres
Chicago Wolves players
Hamilton Bulldogs (AHL) players
Ice hockey people from British Columbia
Kootenay Ice players
Linköping HC players
Living people
Montreal Canadiens draft picks
Montreal Canadiens players
Oulun Kärpät players
People from North Vancouver
St. John's IceCaps players
SCL Tigers players
HC Sochi players
HC Spartak Moscow players
Surrey Eagles players
HC Yugra players
Winnipeg Jets players
Canadian expatriate ice hockey players in Finland
Canadian expatriate ice hockey players in Russia